Simo Olavi Saarinen (born February 14, 1963 in Helsinki, Finland) is a retired professional ice hockey defenceman

Playing career 
Simo Saarinen started his career in his hometown team Helsingin IFK. Saarinen played once in the European Junior Ice Hockey Championships and twice in the World Junior Ice Hockey Championships and was soon noticed by NHL scouts. Saarinen was drafted by New York Rangers in the 1982 NHL Entry Draft. After 1984 Olympic Ice Hockey tournament Saarinen went to NHL. Saarinen was injured during his debut season for New York Rangers. Due to the injuries Saarinen did not play in the 1985–86 season and returned to HIFK for 1986–87 season. Saarinen played for HIFK until 1996 when he finally retired from active playing.

After retirement 
After retiring in 1996 Saarinen started to referee ice hockey games in Finland. Saarinen refereed his first SM-liiga games in the 2001–2002 SM-Liiga season. Currently Saarinen referees hockey games in Helsinki and Southern Finland area.

International play 

For Finland Saarinen played twice in Ice Hockey World Championships and three times in Olympic Hockey Tournament. Saarinen was part of the historic Ice Hockey at the 1988 Winter Olympics Ice Hockey Team which won Finland's first international tournament medal, a silver one.

Career statistics

Regular season and playoffs

International

External links 

1963 births
Finnish ice hockey defencemen
HIFK (ice hockey) players
Ice hockey players at the 1984 Winter Olympics
Ice hockey players at the 1988 Winter Olympics
Ice hockey players at the 1992 Winter Olympics
Ice hockey players with retired numbers
Living people
New Haven Nighthawks players
New York Rangers draft picks
New York Rangers players
Olympic ice hockey players of Finland
Olympic silver medalists for Finland
Ice hockey people from Helsinki
Olympic medalists in ice hockey
Medalists at the 1988 Winter Olympics